Fabien Bossy (born 1 October 1977), is a French football retired central defender and current manager.

Career
Bossy was born in Marseille. He joined Clydebank in 2002, but after the club was franchised in 2002, he had a brief spell with Ayr United, before spending a year with Clyde. He then moved to England, where he played for Darlington and Whitby Town. He returned in France and played for Étoile Fréjus Saint-Raphaël in Championnat National and CFA2 leagues. In December 2011, he was promoted as manager of the reserve squad of this team.

References

External links

 Profile at footballdatabase.eu

Living people
1977 births
Association football central defenders
French footballers
French expatriate footballers
Expatriate footballers in Portugal
Expatriate footballers in Scotland
Expatriate footballers in England
Clydebank F.C. (1965) players
Ayr United F.C. players
Clyde F.C. players
Darlington F.C. players
Whitby Town F.C. players
Scottish Football League players
English Football League players
ÉFC Fréjus Saint-Raphaël players
US Marseille Endoume players